Kumilakudi is a village in the Papanasam taluk of Thanjavur district, Tamil Nadu, India.

Demographics 

As per the 2001 census, Kothangudi had a total population of 1136 with 567 males and 569 females. The sex ratio was 1004. The literacy rate was 76.21.

References 

 

Villages in Thanjavur district